Ghanam Krishna Iyer (1790–1854) was a composer of Carnatic music and was famous for his padams.  Padams are expressive songs of three of more stanzas, used generally as an accompaniment to classical dance.  Krishna Iyer was a student of the famous composer, Pacchimiriam Adiyappa.  He was also influenced by Saint Tyagaraja and Gopalakrishna Bharathi. The title Ghanam, which associated with music means 'deep' or 'grand', relates to his style of singing.

He met Tyagaraja and composed and sang Summa Summa Varuguma Sugam in raga Athana.  His mudras included Muttukumaara and Velar.

See also

List of Carnatic composers

References
 

Carnatic composers
1854 deaths
1790 births